Jan Luxenburg (12 February 1905 – 30 March 1974) was a Polish footballer. He played in one match for the Poland national football team in 1928.

References

External links
 

1905 births
1974 deaths
Polish footballers
Poland international footballers
Place of birth missing
Association footballers not categorized by position